Cookstown Royal British Legion Football Club (Cookstown RBL) is an intermediate-level football club from Cookstown, County Tyrone, in Northern Ireland, playing in the Intermediate Division of the Ballymena & Provincial League. The club is connected to the Royal British Legion branch in the town. The club plays in the Irish Cup.

External links
 nifootball.co.uk - (For fixtures, results and tables of all Northern Ireland amateur football leagues)

References

Association football clubs in Northern Ireland
Association football clubs in County Tyrone